Mohd Norhakim bin Isa (born 24 January 1993) is a Malaysian footballer who plays as a central midfielder.

Club career

Perak
Norhakim was who was a product of the Perak youth system. He was promoted to the senior team at the age of 19 after winning the 2012 President's Cup. Having scored three goals in 10 league starts for Perak during 2014 season and helped his side avoid relegation. Despite his relatively young age, he possesses every quality you need in a central midfielder as he is capable of dribbling past defenders, passing the ball with flair, and shooting accurately with his strong left foot.

Melaka United
On 20 June 2017, during mid season transfer window, Norhakim signed with Melaka United after a number of seasons with Perak. On 4 July 2017, Norhakim made his debut for Melaka United during Malaysia Cup first match in Darul Aman Stadium. On 11 July 2017, Norhakim made his league debut playing against Kedah which the team ended lost 2–4 in their home.

PKNP

After his contract with Melaka United is become to end, Norhakim switch sides and joined PKNP for a free transfer. He made his debut, playing 56-minutes on 25 February 2018 against Kuala Lumpur in Super League matches, which PKNP won by 2–1. On 26 May 2018, he scored his first goal for the club against his former club, Perak.

Selangor

On 5 December 2018, Norhakim signed as a free agent for Selangor on a one-year contract, which had the option of being extended depending on his performance for the club.

Career statistics

Club

References

External links 
 
 

1993 births
Living people
Malaysian footballers
Malaysia international footballers
Malaysia Super League players
Association football midfielders
Melaka United F.C. players
Perak F.C. players
Malaysian people of Malay descent